Jozef Feranec (14 March 1910 − 3 May 2003) was a Slovak Roman Catholic bishop.

Born in Pobedim, Trenčín Region on 14 March 1910 and ordained in 1932, Feranec was named bishop in February 1973. In March 1973, he was appointed bishop of the Roman Catholic Diocese of Banská Bystrica and retired in 1990.

Feranec died on 3 May 2003, aged 93, in Banská Bystrica.

References

1910 births
People from Nové Mesto nad Váhom District
2003 deaths
20th-century Roman Catholic bishops in Slovakia
Roman Catholic bishops in Czechoslovakia